The world's first skyscraper was built in Chicago in 1885. Since then, the United States has been home to some of the world's tallest skyscrapers. New York City, specifically the borough of Manhattan, notably has the tallest skyline in the country. Eleven American buildings have held the title of tallest building in the world. New York City and Chicago have always been the centers of American skyscraper building. The 10-story Home Insurance Building, built in Chicago in 1885, is regarded as the world's first skyscraper; the building was constructed using a novel steel-loadbearing frame which became a standard of the industry worldwide.

Since its topping out in 2013, One World Trade Center in New York City has been the tallest skyscraper in the United States. However, the observation deck elevation and highest occupied floor of One World Trade Center are surpassed by Central Park Tower, 432 Park Avenue and Chicago's Willis Tower (formerly and still commonly known as the Sears Tower). 111 West 57th Street, and Tribune East Tower will also have higher occupied floors and roofs upon their completion.

If they were still standing today, they would occupy the seventh and eighth positions on the list below, with their replacement—the new One World Trade Center—being excluded.

There are numerous supertall buildings both proposed and under construction throughout the country, concentrated in New York City and Chicago. In New York City, 270 Park Avenue is currently under construction. In Chicago, preparation work for Tribune East Tower has begun. Other tall buildings that are proposed include the  One Bayfront Plaza, and the  One Brickell City Centre in Miami.



Tallest buildings

An equal sign (=) following a rank indicates the same height between two or more buildings. The "Year" column indicates the year in which a building was or will be completed.

* Indicates building is still under construction, but has been topped out.

Tallest buildings by pinnacle height

Standard architectural height measurement, which excludes antennas in building height, is included for comparative purposes.

Indicates building is still under construction, but has been topped out.

Cities with the most skyscrapers

Tallest under construction, approved and proposed

Under construction
This lists buildings that are under construction in the United States and are planned to rise at least . Buildings that have already been topped out are excluded.

 

* Table entries with dashes (—) indicate that information regarding building dates of completion has not yet been released.

Approved and proposed

This lists buildings that are proposed for construction in the United States and are planned to rise at least . A floor count of 50 stories is used as the cutoff for buildings whose heights have not yet been released by their developers.

 

* Table entries with dashes (—) indicate that information regarding building heights, floor counts or dates of completion has not yet been released.

Tallest destroyed
This table lists the 10 tallest buildings in the United States that have been demolished, destroyed, or are undergoing demolition.

Timeline of tallest buildings
This is a list of the history of the tallest buildings in the United States by architectural height.

This lists buildings that once held the title of tallest building in the United States.

See also

Lists of buildings and structures
List of tallest buildings by U.S. state and territory
List of tallest buildings in Central America
List of tallest buildings in North America
List of tallest buildings
List of tallest structures in the United States
List of cities with the most skyscrapers

References

External links

 
United States